Amerivespa is the largest annual motor scooter rally in the United States. The host city varies each year and the event date may range from May to July. Amerivespa is attended by 600-800 scooter enthusiasts from all over North America, Europe, and Asia. The rallies are joint-hosted by the nonprofit organization Vespa Club of America (VCOA), and scooter clubs local to the host city. All makes of scooters are welcome.

The 28th annual Amerivespa rally will be held in the Twin Cities of Minneapolis and Saint Paul, Minnesota on 22–26 June 2022. This rally has been on hiatus since 2020.

Vespa Club of America uses Amerivespa to promote scootering, drive VCOA membership, and to provide a celebratory atmosphere for all scooter enthusiasts. Rally events include; the presence of national and local scooter manufacturers, dealers, and supporting trade organizations displaying their newest products; showcases of the best restored and customized scooters; and group rides around the host city/region led by local scooter clubs.

Amerivespa Host Cities

References

http://wiserways.net/vcoa/amerivespa.html
http://amerivespa.org
http://www.vespaclubofamerica.com/historyofav

Motorcycle rallies in the United States